The Chief Minister is appointed by the President of Sierra Leone to coordinate the operations of all ministries in Government of Sierra Leone.

The incumbent works under the direction of the president to handle the daily operations of the government, including oversight and monitoring. They oversee the implementation the government's goals and priorities across all ministries, departments and agencies. In addition to these responsibilities, the Chief Minister is the chair of three sectoral ministries:  

 Education and Social Development Sector Ministries.
 Finance and Economic Development Sector Ministries.
 Peace, Security, and Justice Sector Ministries.

Dr. David J. Francis (30 April 2018 – 30 April 2021)

Jacob Jusu Saffa (since 30 April 2021)

The position of Chief Minister is the present-day successor to that of Prime Minister of Sierra Leone, which was abolished in 1978.

List of Chief Ministers

See also

 Chief Minister
 Government of Sierra Leone

References

2018 establishments in Sierra Leone
 
Chief